Hyrel 3D is a company which manufactures 3D Printers for home, office and industrial settings, and is based in Atlanta, GA. Hyrel 3D makes modular manufacturing machines that are capable of additive and subtractive processes, including fused deposition modeling. These systems use interchangeable heads that are used to create three-dimensional solid or hollow objects from a digital model, which can be designed or produced from a scan.

History

Hyrel 3D was conceived when a team of engineers bought a 3D printer to prototype parts, and decided they had the expertise to do better.

The company sought initial backing through a Kickstarter campaign, launched on September 6, 2012, which received over 300% of the $50,000.00 funding goal.

Products

Hyrel 3D offers four machines: 

 The Engine, with an open build space
 The System 30M, with an enclosed build area and filtration system
 16A - Hydra, floor unit with 5 print head slots (larger build area)
 The Engine HR, a high resolution machine with enhanced precision

Materials

The Hyrel 3D Printers can print with the following materials as of October, 2013:

Filament Based
 ABS
 PLA
 PET
 Nylon
 Peek

Extrudable
 Standard:
 Rubber (Sugru)
 RTV silicone (Room Temperature Vulcanizing)
 Ceramic Modelling clay
 Reusable:
 Oil-Based Modelling clay (Plasticine)
 Polymer Clay
 Play-Doh
 Firable:
 Porcelain
 Metal clay, including Precious Metal Clay

See also
 3D printing or Rapid manufacturing 
 Additive manufacturing
 Desktop manufacturing
 Digital fabricator
 Instant manufacturing, also known as "direct manufacturing" or "on-demand manufacturing"
 List of 3D printer manufacturers
 Stereolithography

References

External links
 Hyrel 3D Website

3D printer companies
Manufacturing companies based in Atlanta
Fused filament fabrication